The Lord Howe conger (Ariosoma howensis) is an eel in the family Congridae (conger/garden eels). It was described by Allan Riverstone McCulloch and Edgar Ravenswood Waite in 1916, originally under the genus Congermuraena. It is a marine, deep water-dwelling eel which is known from the western Pacific Ocean, including northeastern Australia, New Caledonia, and the South Fiji Basin. It is known to dwell at a depth range of 60–600 metres. Females can reach a maximum total length of 42.2 centimetres.

The species epithet and common name are derived from the Lord Howe Rise, near New Caledonia.

References

Ariosoma
Taxa named by Allan Riverstone McCulloch
Taxa named by Edgar Ravenswood Waite
Fish described in 1916